How to Change the World: Social Entrepreneurs and the Power of New Ideas is a book by journalist David Bornstein about successful social innovation. It was first published in 2003, and an updated edition was published in 2007.

The book explores the definition of a social entrepreneur in the modern world, and provides examples of ordinary people who formed organizations centered on making a difference. Bornstein's purpose is "to call attention to the role of a particular type of actor who propels social change."

Bornstein also discusses the rising global trend towards social entrepreneurialism, arguing that barriers to social change in southern and central Europe, Latin America and Africa are weaker than in previous generations.

Case studies

Bill Drayton 
Bill Drayton, a graduate of Yale Law School, chose to study economics, law, and management because he was inspired to be a part of social change. He founded Ashoka; Innovators for the Public, an organization designed to inspire social change. Ashoka is the name of one of his heroes, an Indian emperor who unified much of South Asia. He used an oak tree as the logo because it reminded him of the proverb; "From little acorns do great trees grow." Drayton dreamed of a day when each citizen could be inspired to use their strengths to contribute towards the solution to a social issue. Bill Drayton traveled extensively to interview other innovators and kept the information on little cards. He then decided to start an office in Delhi, India and later established a second office in Indonesia. He collaborated with key individuals who were already involved in exercising their passions on social issues, such as a woman named Gloria De Souza whose dream was to transform elementary education in India. This connection then gave rise to other key individuals who helped create a multi-disciplinary approach to social change.

Ashoka has worked to combine the strengths of social entrepreneurs and business entrepreneurs at the highest levels. Drayton's vision gave him the ability to see synergy and connection where many of us see only divisions or pieces. He saw value and hope for societal change in the faces of social entrepreneurs who he felt were too disconnected and underfunded. Ashoka focused on social issues such as child mortality, disability rights, Aids patients, and college access. They also worked on reforming health care and access to electricity in Brazil and child protection in India.

In 2005 Drayton received the Yale Law School award of merit, the highest honor award, and was also selected as one of America's 25 best leaders. The overarching mission of Ashoka is to see "Everyone as a Change maker" and this has been done by connecting with individuals who are inspiring real change and networking together to become stronger influencers. Drayton's ability to inspire these key players to collaborate and support each other was the key to the tremendous growth and social change that Ashoka has contributed.

Gloria de Souza

Gloria de Souza's inspiring story begins when, in 1981, she became the first fellow (social entrepreneur) elected to Ashoka: Innovators for the Public, an organization founded by Bill Drayton specializing in collecting information about and supporting local reformers across the world. Ashoka's vision sought to answer the question, "Was it possible to create a system that would, with high reliability, spot major pattern-changing ideas and first-class entrepreneurs before either were born?"  As an elementary school teacher in Bombay with big aspirations, Gloria de Souza could be thought of as Ashoka's "guinea pig," for India was the organization's first targeted country in the search for genuine social entrepreneurism. Her dream was to "transform education across India."

After teaching for twenty years, she could no longer put up with the Indian schools' traditional ways of teaching. Author David Bornstein notes, "Nothing pained her more than to walk through a school hallway and hear students repeating in unison, 'Here we go 'round the mulberry bush.' To her, this rote learning—a holdover from the colonial era—was the very sound of minds being deadened." She knew she must do something.

After attending a workshop on experiential and environmental education in 1971, she was inspired. With great excitement and vision, de Souza presented these revolutionary ideas to her colleagues, but to no avail; they continually turned her down. So, "she set aside her textbooks with their references to robins, bluebirds, and willow trees and took her students outside to learn about local birds and plants and explore questions such as: 'Why do monsoons come and go?'" Though other teachers criticized her, her students responded enthusiastically.

She tried and failed many times over next five years to get the school to adopt her methods. When she met Drayton, she had finally made progress in persuading the teaching staff at her school and was working on spreading the ideas to a second school. However, she knew that the real obstacle would be extending the methods of experiential education to the entire public school system in Bombay—and beyond.

Gloria de Souza saw a problem and wanted to fix it - more than that, she felt as though she must fix it. In conversation with Drayton, she said, "Something is deeply wrong in our society. And I think I can do something very important with this idea. If we can help children grow up learning to think rather than memorize and repeat, learning to problem solve, learning to be creative, learning to be actors rather than acted upon, we can create a generation that will be very different. And India will be different. And that's a revolution."

Though the concept of experiential education was nothing new to many major countries at the time, it was new to India. Drayton took interest in de Souza not merely for her teaching ideas, but for "her ability to adapt them to India's specific circumstances--then market them." Success in this sphere would require not mere giftedness, but "salesmanship and resourcefulness and thick skin and a level of commitment bordering on obsession." Ashoka was looking for people who possessed these types of qualities, and Drayton knew that he had found this kind of person in Gloria de Souza.

Support from Ashoka allowed de Souza to stop teaching full time and concentrate on her newfound passion. The next year, she founded her own organization, Parisar Asha (meaning "hope in the environment" in Sanskrit), and began working on building up a team of idea-spreaders. Within several years, she was able to show other teachers and schools that her methods, called Environmental Studies (EVS), "significantly increased students' performance." They did indeed—one evaluation showed that students studying with EVS scored and mastered subjects twice to three times higher and faster than students involved in rote learning. Because of de Souza's influence, over the following decade, EVS was introduced in a million schools through a pilot program, taught to almost a million students, and was incorporated into the Indian government's national curriculum. 	

Gloria de Souza was the embodiment of social entrepreneurialism in that she used what she loved the most (i.e., teaching children) to fix what she hated the most (i.e., rote learning and minds being deadened). Though de Souza passed away in 2013, her legacy still lives on—in the organization in which she invested so much of herself and in the ideas she left behind that have bolstered change in the world of education.

Erzsebet Szekeres

One indication of a successful Entrepreneur, according to David Bornstein, is a, "Willingness to Break Free of Established Structures." Such willingness is demonstrated in the life and work of Erzsebet Szekeres, of Hungary. Szekeres created an entirely new procedure to manage the mentally disabled in her country; this is because her son, Tibor, had microcephalus , which is a condition that includes, "abnormal smallness of the head and severe mental retardation." To many, the simple solution to dealing with the disabled was to send them to institutions for their lives, this was not an option for Szekeres. Many of the institutions that Szekeres could have placed Tibor in were merely there to keep the patients out of trouble, and did not take anything beyond their barest needs into account; she wanted to change that. Szekeres created her own place for the mentally and physically disabled to live and work, called the Alliance Industrial Union, or Alliance for short. While in state-run institutions the residents were often locked up and/or tranquilized, the higher-functioning residents of Alliance lived in their own apartments with little supervision, those who could not live on their own share a house with other residents and staff members, called helpers. Residents at Alliance were also given jobs that they were paid for, many of which were in manufacturing, according to their abilities. While institutions were generally structured in a manner similar to prisons, Alliance was structured much like an ordinary town, complete with its own restaurant. Also unlike many other institutions that treated their adult residents as children and regulated nearly every aspect of their lives; Alliance residents could act like autonomous beings, and adhered only to rules that were nearly the same as those one might encounter in any other town. Another nontraditional aspect of Alliance was that they encouraged and assisted their residents to move out of Alliance and into towns and support themselves (if they were able, of course).

The entrepreneurship of Erzsebet Szekeres 
In chapter 9 of his book, "How to Change the World," David Bornstein gives us a picture of the impact Erzsebet Szekeres made in Hungary. The standard for the way care was provided for the disabled was forever changed. Because of the vision she had of a better future for her mentally and physically disabled son, Tibor, love and compassion became her motivation. She wanted to see a world in which Tibor could successfully live in society. She began to understand that there is only a quantitative difference between the disabled and the non-disabled. And it does not change their quality in society. As Szekeres began to visit the horrible institutions for the disabled, she saw an urgent need for change, and she engaged in it. It was very difficult to start a private organization at first, since Hungary was a communist country. So she started with a small group of disabled individuals and taught them simple skills that they could use to work a job, and that grew larger and changed over the years. It eventually became a functional and beautiful community where disabled individuals could come and take up a residency, learn a skill and make a living, and learn how to live independently if possible. There were many times where she failed, or her efforts seemed to be going nowhere. But she never gave up, she persevered. There were times where she became depressed from her failed attempts, but she would remember her son and find the strength to persevere. It was her empathy and compassion for the disabled that truly drove her and made her relentless in her pursuits.

Veronica Khosa

Veronica Khosa is a South African nurse who created an AIDS home care organization called Tateni to fill a gap in the healthcare system of Pretoria and the nearby township of Mamelodi. In her work with Tateni, Khosa displayed an entrepreneurial trait that David Bornstein calls "Willingness to Work Quietly" as she focused on serving the community's needs, running the organization out of an old shed and using her own retirement savings when the government and philanthropic organizations would not financially support her work.

Khosa was raised by her grandmother in the township of Mamelodi, near Pretoria in the province of Gauteng in South Africa. From a young age she was interested in nursing, watching her grandmother, a midwife, deliver babies. After completing school, she began training as a nurse at a missionary hospital, where she learned to improvise treatment and teach family members to care for rural patients. In 1991, while working in a Pretoria AIDS testing center, she encountered the problem of hospitals sending home AIDS patients with neither medications nor instructions for home care. Realizing that lack of both correct information about AIDS and home care for AIDS patients was a serious problem in Mamelodi, Khosa enlisted the help of several retired nurses in making home visits to patients who could not afford to visit an AIDS center. Shortly after watching one of her patients die because he was locked in his house with no water, Khosa talked with a group of young prostitutes who wanted different jobs to avoid getting AIDS. She realized that the lack of AIDS home care and lack of jobs for young people could be connected to alleviate both problems. Since no organization existed to provide training for home care of AIDS patients, Khosa designed her own curriculum and held classes in an old shed.

In 1995, Veronica Khosa retired from working with the Pretoria City Council and started Tateni Home Care Services. From their first office in the old tin shed where classes were held to a larger building where supplies were often stolen, Tateni faced financial difficulties. Early on, Khosa found that patients did not want their neighbors to know that they were receiving help from an AIDS care organization, because this would make it obvious that they had AIDS. However, after publicly changing Tateni's focus to general home care in response to a community survey, she found that potential donors were reluctant to give to the organization, since it was not specifically focused on AIDS. Because of Tateni's financial difficulties, Khosa ended up using her retirement savings to run the organization.

Finally, in the late 1990s, UN attention to AIDS home care and to the work of Tateni caused the government of the province of Gauteng to seek change in the healthcare system. Their approach was modeled on Tateni, and they implemented as policy some of Khosa's main suggestions to them. The government began supporting several AIDS care organizations, including Tateni, and continued to increase its support as more home care organizations were formed.

Fabio Rosa

According to Ashoka, "Social entrepreneurs are individuals with innovative solutions to society's most pressing social problems. They are ambitious and persistent, tackling major social issues and offering new ideas for wide-scale change."  Entrepreneurs are consumed with ideas. They aren't happy to simply express their idea; they need their idea to make a change in society. Another quality about entrepreneurs is the ability to be realistic. "A real entrepreneur has to listen to the environment very well. You cannot cause major social change unless you really understand what's going on."  All of these qualities were displayed in Fabio Rosa, a man with the desire to spread electricity to poor sections in Brazil. In 1982 Ney Azevedo, the new mayor of Palmares, got Rosa connected in hopes of improving the lives of the people living in that region. Rosa initially started working on solving the problem of irrigation for the farmers. The price of water was high for them, and the only good solution for this problem was to use electricity to get the water out of the ground. In his research, Rosa heard about Ennio Amaral, a professor who had devised an effective yet relatively low-cost electrification system. Rosa was able to gain permission to experiment with Amaral's system, and then using water pumps he was able to start solving the irrigation problem for the citizens of Palmares. After that Rosa experienced many difficulties. He found it hard to gain financial support so that he could continue to spread electricity and irrigation systems to areas outside of Palmares, and changes in government officials caused his work to almost come to a complete halt. Rosa continued to persevere despite this though, and he was able to get electricity to 25,000 farmers in the early 1990s. His work was slowed again though, and he changed his method of action. After starting his own company, Agroelectric Adequate Technology Systems in 1992, Rosa began selling low-cost products that converted solar energy into electricity. He knew that the lack of fencing in Brazil was causing there to be overgrazing by the livestock, so he started distributing electric fences to solve this problem. Rosa acquired national recognition through this process, because his method was so successful. By this point he had distributed solar electric systems across Brazil. After this Rosa developed more projects, including the Quiron Project which saved poor families money while using various methods to protect the environment, and The Sun Shines for All which provided families with solar panels using a rental system. 
All of these accomplishments could have caused Rosa to acquire an inflated ego, but instead he refused to receive all the honor. He displayed what David Borenstein has called "Willingness to Share Credit," which is one of the qualities of a social entrepreneur.

Jeroo Billimoria

Jeroo Billimoria is the founder of Childline, which is a twenty-four-hour helpline for children needing help. Billimoria did post graduate work in New York City, becoming involved in a project called "Coalition for the Homeless," a nonprofit that assists the homeless. "I was very moved by the spirit of survival among the homeless," Billimoria said. She found herself drawn to the children back home in Bombay, India, and discovered that they needed to be acknowledged, that they were "proud." The children began calling Billimoria, "Didi," which means "big sister." Soon, Billimoria realized that it could take days for a street child to receive help in an emergency, and her idea for Childline was born. Billimoria wanted to network the various organizations that give assistance to children together. Ultimately, Billimoria was inspired to start a twenty-four-hour hotline that could provide immediate response to the needs of Bombay's street children. Since then, Childline has expanded into forty-two cities, 120 organizations implement the service, and as of October 2002, Childline has fielded over 2.7 million calls. Childline is an organization that deeply cares for the rights of a child, and goes to great lengths to demonstrate respect and courtesy for each individual. Despite all this, Billimoria is humble and acknowledges her weaknesses. Since resigning from Childline, she stated, "I was a lousy administrator." Billimoria's genius for setting up a thriving organization that assists children lies in her ability to synthesize available resources by linking various programs together, seeing a problem, and envisioning a bold, simple solution.

James P. Grant 

During his time of leadership at UNICEF, James P. Grant demonstrated the social entrepreneurial characteristic of a "Strong Ethical Impetus." Simply, the entrepreneurial trait of a strong ethical impetus means to be motivated by a desire for justice, not wealth or power. Grant demonstrated this quality by his constant, energetic motivation to put an end to the premature deaths of easily cured, sick children around the world. In 1980, James P. Grant became the leader of UNICEF. When he acquired this leadership position, Grant had already perceived a strong vision of where he wanted UNICEF to make its mark on the world. Although the specific strategies had not yet been evaluated, Grant knew that he wanted to put an end to the easily curable, premature deaths of unvaccinated, malnourished, and severely dehydrated children. Although seen as slightly crazy by co-workers and the public alike, Grant initiated UNICEF's core strategy: GOBI-FFF. This acronym, which addresses the specific areas that Grant desired to reform, stands for Growth monitoring, Oral Rehydration Therapy, Breastfeeding, Immunization, Food supplements, Family planning, and Female education. Establishing this new foundation attracted many prominent supporters, such as William Foege and Audrey Hepburn; however, it also attracted quite a few cynics, such as Halfdan Mahler. Due to his integrity and hard work, Grant was finally able to gain the support of the president of Columbia for a vaccination campaign. This campaign consisted of three days of vaccinating the children of Columbia. Because of this campaign, more vaccination campaigns were able to be established in other countries. Another a huge accomplishment Grant achieved was the World Summit for Children, which consisted of seventy-one world state leaders meeting together to discuss UNICEF and its mission of saving the sick children. Amazingly, the World Summit for Children was the biggest collection of world leaders who had come together to discuss one specific concern. Despite having to go against the very grain of society, James P. Grant radically changed the lives of children everywhere.

Florence Nightingale 
Though no one believed in her, even her own parents, Florence Nightingale proved to be one of history's greatest example of a social entrepreneur: an individual with innovative solutions to social issues. In her time, nursing was considered a very negative term which generally implied a woman of a rough nature who was often drunk or involved in illegitimate sexual activities. However, as is evident now, Nightingale transformed nursing into a highly respected vocation. How did she perform such a monumental accomplishment against all odds? Not through gentle charm or merely giving her time and resources, "it was by strict method, by stern discipline, by rigid attention to detail, by ceaseless labor, by the fixed determination of an indomitable will." She knew she had the ability to make an extremely beneficial impact, and even though it reversed society's norm, she succeeded in fulfilling her dreams. Florence Nightingale will forever be remembered as a great social entrepreneur for her heroic work in the field of nursing.

Nightingale's "indomitable will" may have been her most instrumental trait in accomplishing her radical ideas and plans. Beginning with strong resistance from her parents, and continuing to the point of defying army officers, her calling was a constant struggle against society's standards. Like Nightingale, every social entrepreneur will face opposition at some career point. It comes with the very definition of an entrepreneur. Entrepreneurs defy cultural norms to find revolutionary, though often seemingly insane, ideas to solve the problems of life. "It takes concentrated focus, practical creativity, and a long-term source of energy to advance a system change and to ensure that the change becomes well rooted in institutions and cultures." Social entrepreneurs must have the courage and indomitable will of Florence Nightingale to succeed in a world so resistant to change.

J.B. Schramm 

J.B. Schramm, the founder of College Summit, used his high-school and college experiences to create revolutionary college assistance for under-average teens. As a social entrepreneur in David Bornstein's book, How to Change the World, Schramm undertakes the challenge of reforming not only the way schools equip students for college, but also how students view their own strengths in lieu of what test scores might tell them.
Charismatic and friendly, Schramm traveled through his years of primary and secondary school with the same group of buddies. When the time came for him to graduate from high-school, he had no doubt of his friends attending college. "We all had our strengths. And I just assumed that we'd all go on to the next stage in life together. College was a given," explains Schramm. Although he was accepted to Yale University, Schramm was shocked to find his friends were not continuing to higher education. "It lodged in me," says Schramm, "It profoundly didn't make sense. And the difference was not that they were less college capable than I was"

From that time on, Schramm had a desire to see other students succeed to higher education. Schramm started working with teens who attended an after-school program with Good Shephard Ministries in 1991. He quickly realized that many of the kids had potential talents and strengths, but were not confident in their own college ability. Also, their middle ranged grades did not attract college admissions. Starting with only four students, Schramm created an intensive essay workshop, teaching and equipping the students with tools to write an essay that would help them be accepted into college. All four were admitted into schools. Schramm experimented again with four more students, and procured the same results. Students that Schramm worked with had college potential; they just needed some guidance and counsel "beyond what their test scores reveal." Soon after the experimental attempts, Schramm founded College Summit in 1995. It composed of a four-day student preparatory college intensive that trained students how to write essays that will assist with admission into colleges. Schramm instilled coaches who worked alongside the kids, helping them apply to schools, and conducting follow-ups during their years in college. College Summit works alongside other universities, partnering with them and running workshops on campus. Schramm took the opportunity to work with several high-schools in 1997 and 1998. In 1999, "Senior Year Navigator Curriculum" was introduced by College Summit to help equip teachers with the tools to equip students for college. In 2000, Schramm was elected by Ashoka, and was given an annual award by the National Association for College Admission Counseling. By 2003, College Summit had worked with nearly 5,000 students, 95% of them minorities. Today J.B. Schramm is still working to implant College Summit into cities, colleges, and high-schools, all across the U.S.

Vera Cordeiro 
Vera Cordeiro is a physician as well as a social entrepreneur. She founded Asociação Saúde Criança Renascer (Rebirth: Association for Children's Health), which is a network of orghi kids that continues giving health care to children after they are dismissed from public hospitals. In Brazil millions of children suffer from chronic malnutrition. When Cordeiro founded Renascer in 1991 she was working in the public ward of Hospital da la Lagoa, which was a public hospital in Rio. Seeing the children get discharged from the hospital and returning sick again weeks later broke her heart. She said, "I could not stand to go one more day seeing children locked in this cycle of hospitalization, re-hospitalization, and death." She founded Renascer so that sick children would not return straight to the slums after being dismissed from the hospital only to get sick again. By 2007 Cordeiro opened sixteen public hospitals in Rio de Janeiro, São Paulo, and Recife, helping more than 20,000 children. In 1999 the director of Lagoa's pediatrics unit, Odilo Arantes, reported that, between 1991 and 1997, Renascer had brought a 60% drop in readmissions to the unit. Arantes is quoted as saying, "Before Renascer, we used to spend lots of effort and money in the emergency room or ICU on treatment knowing that there was a high probability that kids might die afterward from lack of assistance and follow up at home. Now when we discharge a poor child, we can feel at peace. And this makes our work more meaningful and rewarding." In Renascer's headquarters there is a framed quotation from Goethe that says,"Whatever you can do or dream, you can begin it now. Boldness has genius, power, and magic in it. Begin it now." Vera Cordeiro certainly lived up to that quotation in her life. Cordeiro displays an amazing determination and love for the children and their families that lived in the slums. She is someone who was able to put her city in order and benefit thousands of children and families around her.

Erzsebet Szekeres 
Erzsebet Szekeres is from Hungary and is a disability rights activist and social entrepreneur. Her son, Tibor, was born with mental and physical disabilities. When Erzsebet had learned the chances of her son living into adulthood she felt led to help other individuals facing similar problems as her son. Erzsebet has contributed to the rights of disabled individuals, mainly adults, in Hungary by eliminating three big issues that they face; "lack of job training, few employment opportunities, and a housing shortage.." While solving these issues she has helped disabled individuals gain more independence, she has also replaced the outdated equipment and resources that her community had provided for these individuals.

Erzsebet took a unique approach to this issue. Instead taking after other programs that were provided for disabled individuals in her community, Erzsebet used a "macro-approach," she didn't just focus on one area of the issue, she focused on the issue as a whole. "Her approach addresses all of the fundamental components for a happy and productive life." She provides educational and training opportunities for young adults, then she works to place them in work environments where they are able to apply what they have learned. She also is focused on the issue of housing, she has helped develop special housing designed to provide disabled individuals with the greatest amount of independence possible. Lastly, she is providing complete psychological counseling for the disabled individual and their families.

Erzsebet said that her desire to work in this area was based on her experiences with her son. Her work requires her to think of new and different ways to solve problems and issues. Erzsebet says that she checks every decision she makes against the statement: Would this be a good solution for my own son?

Javed Abidi 
Javed Abidi was sick of seeing the disabled in India being treated horribly by its citizens and government. As the executive director of the National Center for the Promotion of Employment for Disabled People (NCPEDP), he constantly strived to help improve the situation in his country, but to no avail. Part of the reason he was so passionate about this issue is that he himself was born disabled, and had been struggling with it for his whole life. While he didn't let it get the best of him, he could see how many others who were disabled in India were being neglected, and his goal became doing something about that. For years, he and his colleagues pushed for the government to do something about this massive problem that plagued India, but still didn't receive the attention they needed. Finally, during an important government meeting, he gathered a big crowd of protestors to help fight for the cause, and it worked. One of the officials came to talk to them about their concerns, and the bill they wanted to pass. The official brought it before the government parties, and the bill was passed in 1995. After years and years of fighting on this important issue, Javed finally saw the light at the end of the tunnel. While there is still much work to be done in India to help fully solve this issue, Javed has already made a big impact, and continues to do so by working through various organizations that make a difference in the lives of the disabled.

References

External links 
 

2007 books